Reggie Williams may refer to:

Basketball
Reggie Williams (basketball, born 1964), former basketball player in the NBA
Reggie Williams (basketball, born 1986), American basketball guard

Baseball
Reggie Williams (1980s outfielder) (born 1960), former outfielder in MLB during the 1980s
Reggie Williams (1990s outfielder) (born 1966), former outfielder in MLB during the 1990s

Others
Reggie Williams (Canadian football) (born 1983), American wide receiver who currently plays in the CFL
Reggie Williams (wide receiver) (born 1983), American wide receiver who formerly played in the NFL
Reggie Williams (linebacker) (born 1954), former linebacker in the NFL
Reggie Williams (activist) (1951–1999), American activist who spread awareness of HIV/AIDS to communities of color
Reggie Williams (cricketer) (born 1969), English cricketer

See also
Reginald Williams (disambiguation)